His New Grey Trousers is a 1915 Danish silent film directed by Lau Lauritzen Sr. The film stars Oscar Stribolt and Carl Schenstrøm.

Cast
Oscar Stribolt - Paludan Plum, digter
Carl Schenstrøm - Adam Brink, skuespiller
Agnes Andersen -  Bella, en livlig pige
Frederik Buch - En skomagerdreng
Franz Skondrup

External links
Danish Film Institute

1915 films
Danish silent films
Films directed by Lau Lauritzen Sr.
Danish black-and-white films